Marco Artunghi (born 12 July 1969) is an Italian former professional racing cyclist. He rode in four editions of the Tour de France, two editions of the Giro d'Italia and one edition of the Vuelta a España.

References

External links
 

1969 births
Living people
Italian male cyclists
Cyclists from the Province of Brescia
People from Chiari, Lombardy